Army engineering maintenance consists of those engineers, technicians, and military organizations responsible for the expert repair and maintenance of army vehicles,  weapon systems, and other equipment.

Army engineering maintenance should not be confused with military engineering which is distinctly separate and analogous to civil engineering while the former analogous to mechanical engineering and electrical engineering.

Operational and tactical level focus
At the operational and tactical levels, army engineering maintenance is focused on the repair and scheduled maintenance work required to keep army equipment fleets operational.

Strategic level focus
At the strategic level, army engineering maintenance is closely linked to military logistics. At this level, it includes work such as the design, development, and testing of new vehicles and weapon systems. It also includes lifecycle management activities once new systems become operational.

Army engineering in nations' armed forces
Royal Australian Electrical and Mechanical Engineers – Australia
Corps of Royal Canadian Electrical and Mechanical Engineers – Canada
Royal New Zealand Army Logistic Regiment – New Zealand
Pakistan Army Corps of Electrical and Mechanical Engineering – Pakistan
Royal Electrical and Mechanical Engineers – United Kingdom
Ordnance Corps – United States
Indian Army Corps of Electronics and Mechanical Engineering - India

See also
Motor transport
Armoured recovery vehicle
Systems engineering
Military engineering

Notes

Military maintenance
Military trucks
Military technology
Engineering disciplines